Nail Gun Massacre is a 1986 American rape-and-revenge slasher film directed by Terry Lofton and Bill Leslie. A young doctor and a sheriff seek a killer in a motorcycle helmet who kills locals with a nail gun.

Plot 
At a construction site in east Texas, six men gang rape Linda Jenkins. Five months later, a person in camouflage clothing and black motorcycle helmet kills one of the rapists with a nail gun. One month later another rapist, Mark, cuts some wood with his friend Brad. As Brad urinates, the killer shoots him in the crotch and stomach. As Mark revs up the chainsaw, the killer sneaks up behind him and shoots him in the back of the neck. Mark falls and the chainsaw severs his hand.

When Doc, the town doctor and coroner, arrives at the crime scene, the sheriff shows him the bodies. The doctor mentions that three bodies have been found on Old Lady Bailey's property. The sheriff asks the wife of the first murder victim if her husband was a carpenter, and he leaves to call the "meat wagon."

The killer picks up a hitchhiker, then shoots him in the stomach, causing him to jump out of the moving vehicle. He then stops the car and kills the hitchhiker. The sheriff and Doc are called to the hardware store where a young woman was found nailed behind the store. Minutes later, they are called to the road outside of town where the hitchhiker was nailed to the concrete in the middle of the road.

Maxine, John and Tom are eating at a diner where she reveals Old Bailey let them stay in a house for free because someone was murdered there. The next day, the trio buys lumber from the lumber yard to fix the house. Hal and Ben arrive with their girlfriends Ann and Trish, to ask the owner, Bubba, for a job. He tells them of Maxine's place and the group leaves. After they leave, Linda shows up and asks Bubba if the two men were construction workers.

At Maxine's place, the group sees no one at home, and sit on a blanket for a picnic. Hal and Ann go for a walk in the woods and have sex. They are killed and nailed to a tree by the killer. Trish urges Ben to look for them. The killer nails Ben's hands to a tree. Maxine, John and Tom return to the house. John comforts a frightened Trish. John and Tom discover the bodies of Hal, Ben, and Ann and call the Sheriff. They unload the lumber from the truck and Maxine voices her worries of the killer. They also find their nail gun missing.

The next day, two carpenters are working on a house when they playfully shoot at each other with nail guns. When they go back into the partially constructed house, the killer shoots one in the head. The killer, speaking with a distorted voice, tells the other carpenter to think back six months ago. When the carpenter mentions the raping, the killer kills him. The killer then murders a couple making out on the hood of their car, and a family man in a suburban house.

After following various leads, the Sheriff eventually realizes six of the victims worked at a construction site. Six month ago, Linda Jenkins, now established to be Bubba's sister, was raped after delivering supplies at the site. The six rapists walked away thanks to the lack of evidence. That evening, two women walking in the nearby woods are attacked and killed.

The next morning, Doc calls Linda and asks to speak to Bubba, but she hangs up. Doc drives over to the lumber yard and confronts Linda, who tells him Bubba is out driving his hearse. Doc and Linda drive along the road and find the hearse and give chase. Soon, the sheriff joins them and the chases lead to a textile factory. The killer exits the car and runs, pursued by Sheriff and Doc. They chase the killer through the factory to the limestone mounds. The killer climbs up a crane, but slips and falls to his death. Linda walks up to the dead killer and removes his helmet, revealing him to be Bubba. The killings now over, Doc walks away with the traumatized Linda.

Cast 
 Rocky Patterson as Doctor Rocky Jones
 Ron Queen as Sheriff Thomas
 Beau Leland as Bubba Jenkins
 Michelle Meyer as Linda Jenkins
 Sebrina Lawless as Mary Sue Johnson
 Monica Lawless as Bobbi Jo Johnson
 Jerry Nelson as Leroy Johnson
 Mike Coady as Mark

Production
Prior to directing the film, writer and director Terry Lofton was a stuntman on The Dukes of Hazzard in the 1980s. Nail Gun Massacre was shot in Texas.

Release
The film was released on VHS by Magnum Entertainment. The film was not released in the United States theatrically. Lofton later produced a making-of the film in 2005 titled Nail. It was released on DVD by Synapse in 2005.

Reception 
A reviewer credited as "Lor." of Variety on the Magnum Entertainment video cassette on May 2, 1987. "Lor." referred to the film as an amateurish horror feature" noting that acting and technical credits were poor stating that the premise "proves to be funny, realistic blood effects are the pic's raison d'etre."

TV Guide was given one out of four stars rating. In his book overviewing of splatter films of the 1980s, Scott Aaron Stine described the film as an exercise in "low-rent filmmaking" and a "typically lame slasher flick". The review concluded that the film was an inexcusable sexist tripe that will only appeal to indiscriminate splatterpunks."

DVD Talk's Adam Tyner gave the film a grade of 1½ out of 5, and concluded, "Y'know, if I watch something and have a genuinely good time with it, even if it's for all the wrong reasons, I can't really consider it a bad movie. It's not quite the Troll 2 of slasher movies, but I had more fun with Nail Gun Massacre... laughing and screaming at my TV... than any other movie I've watched in a very long time". In a review for DVD Verdict, Paul Corupe heavily criticized the film, writing, "A sleazy slasher from the 'anything goes' VHS heyday of the early 1980s. Put on by Texas entrepreneur Terry Lofton. There are moments of unintentionally hilarious reprieve on display throughout the film."

References

Footnotes

Sources

External links 
 
 

1980s serial killer films
1980s slasher films
American slasher films
1986 horror films
1986 independent films
Films set in Texas
American serial killer films
1980s English-language films
American rape and revenge films
American independent films
1980s American films
1986 films